Paul Sanders (born 11 January 1962) is a British former track and field sprinter who specialised in the 400 metres. He was a gold medallist at the 1990 European Athletics Championships, running in the British men's 4 × 400 metres relay quartet alongside Kriss Akabusi, John Regis, and Roger Black. Their winning time of 2:58.22 minutes was a European record at the time and remains the European Championship record.

Sanders competed twice for Great Britain individually, reaching the semi finals at the 1990 European Athletics Championships and the quarter-finals at the 1991 World Championships in Athletics. He ranked third in Europe on time in the 1991 season, with his lifetime best of 45.33 seconds for the distance.

He did not win any title at the AAA Championships during his career but did win two titles at the UK Athletics Championships, first in 1989 then again in 1991. He was also runner-up in 1988 (to Brian Whittle) and 1990 (to Roger Black). At sub-national level, he was the 1986 winner of the 400 m at the Inter-Counties Championships.

Sanders was coached by Mike Smith, who was also coach to British sprinters Akabusi, Black and Iwan Thomas.

International competitions

National titles
UK Athletics Championships
400 m: 1989, 1991

See also
List of European Athletics Championships medalists (men)
List of British champions in 400 metres

References

External links

Living people
British male sprinters
European Athletics Championships medalists
World Athletics Championships athletes for Great Britain
1962 births